The Varne Bank or Varne Shoal is a  long sand bank in the Strait of Dover, lying  southwest of Dover in Kent, England. With the Lobourg Channel running along it, the Varne bank lies immediately south-west of the deepest point  in the strait of Dover. Its rectilinear shape is similar to other banks in the strait such as South Falls bank bordering the Lobourg Channel on the east, the Colbart bank (a.k.a. the Ridge) and others. Rectilinear-shaped banks are only present on the English side of the strait.

Lying almost in the middle of the south/west international traffic English-side channel of the English Channel, the Varne Bank is a constant concern for both British coastguards and shipping. 
The sea above it presents strong rippling, especially when strong tides occur, and is noted for its extra roughness during bad weather.

Ships that founder on the Varne Bank are often stated as being lost on the Goodwin Sands in error, perhaps because the Varne Bank is less well known than its close northerly neighbour. Due to the volume increase in shipping through the world's busiest channel, several proposals have been made to eliminate the Varne Bank through dredging. However, also due to its shallow depth, the Varne Bank is a productive location for fishing, especially for cod and scallops.

In 1802, mining engineer Albert Mathieu made proposals to Napoleon for turning the Varne Bank into an island staging point for the Channel Tunnel.

In the 20th century, a proposal was made for a Channel bridge, which would have used the Varne Bank as a staging post for a support structure.

Several naval battles have been fought nearby, including the Battle of Dover and Battle of Dungeness in 1652 and the Battle of Dover Strait in 1917.

The Varne Bank along with its neighbouring bank Colbart, the Vergoyer bank, the ridens (fr) de Boulogne and the French side of the Bassurelle bank, form part of a  Natura 2000 protection zone listed under the name « Ridens et dunes hydrauliques du détroit du Pas de Calais » ("Underwater ridges and dunes of the strait of Pas de Calais").

References

Landforms of Kent
English Channel
Dover District
Thanet
Sandbanks of England
Strait of Dover